Pottsboro Independent School District is a public school district based in Pottsboro, Texas (USA).

In 2010, the school district was rated "exemplary" by the Texas Education Agency.

Schools
Pottsboro Elementary (Grades PK-3)
Pottsboro Intermediate (Grades 4-5)
Pottsboro Middle (Grades 6-8)
Pottsboro High (Grades 9-12)

References

External links
 

School districts in Grayson County, Texas